Jesús Guillermo Mariotto (Caracas, 13 April 1966) is a Venezuelan-Italian fashion designer and TV personality.

Education and first collaborations 
Born in Caracas to a Venezuelan mother and an Italian father, Guillermo Mariotto has lived for many decades in Rome.

He made his debut in the show at the age of 17, in 1983, as a theatrical set designer in Gl'innamorati by Carlo Goldoni, for the company "I Commedianti Italiani", directed by Antonio Pierfederici, director and actor In addition to directing, Pierfederici played the protagonist Fabrizio. The other performers were: Claudia Balboni (Eugenia), Stefano Breschi (Fulgenzio), Linda Sini (Flamminia), Mauro Bosco (Roberto), Mario Gigantini (Ridolfo), Derio Pino (Succianespole), Maria Teresa Gelli (Clorinda). The scenes were designed by Mariotto, while the costumes were created by the Farani company. It was set at the Vittoriale degli Italiani, in Gardone Riviera, in the last residence of Gabriele D'Annunzio.

Later, he graduated from the California College of Arts and Craft in San Francisco. To deepen and learn more about art and design, Mariotto embarks on a journey to Europe: Paris, London, Milan. Having joined the style office of Basile, he collaborated for the women's prêt-à-porter collections of the Milanese brand. Later he joined Krizia and Dolce & Gabbana.

Having come into contact with Roman haute couture, in 1988 he met Raniero Gattinoni, engaged in the relaunch of the brand founded by Fernanda Gattinoni in 1946. In 1994 he became creative director of the maison. Among the numerous characters, he dressed Raffaella Carrà, Beyoncé, Pope Benedict XVI.

Personal life 
Mariotto is openly gay and he's also a devout Roman Catholic.

Filmography 
 Vacanze di Natale a Cortina, directed by Neri Parenti (2011)

Television 
 Ballando con le stelle (Rai 1, since 2005)
 Notti sul ghiaccio (Rai 1, 2006–2007)
 Domenica in... passerella (Rai 1, 2009)
 Miss Italia (Rai 1, 2007, 2009–2010)
 Donna tutto si fa per te (Rai Educational-Rai 3, 2011)
 Ballando on the Road (Rai 1, 2017–2019, 2021)
 The Real (TV8, 2017)
 Domenica in (Rai 1, 2018, 2020)
 Detto fatto (Rai 2, 2019–2020)
 Il cantante mascherato (Rai 1, 2020)
 ItaliaSì! (Rai 1, 2020)
 La vita in diretta (Rai 1, 2020)

Books

Notes 

Italian fashion designers
Venezuelan fashion designers
LGBT fashion designers
LGBT Christians
Italian Roman Catholics
Venezuelan Roman Catholics